The following is a list of episodes for the British sitcom Upstart Crow, which began airing on BBC Two from 9 May 2016.

Series overview

Series 1 (2016)

Series 2 (2017)

All episodes of series 2 were made available through BBC iPlayer on 11 September 2017.

Series 3 (2018)

Christmas Special (2020)

Ratings 
Ratings sourced from BARB.

Series 1 (2016)

Series 2 (2017)

Series 3 (2018)

References

External links
 

BBC-related lists
Lists of British sitcom episodes